This list of French exonyms for Italian toponyms is a compilation of Italian toponyms, names of cities, regions, rivers, mountains and other geographical features which are francized in Italy , Italian Switzerland and other areas which are Italian-speaking or influenced by the Italian language.

A
Abruzzo Abruzzes
Acceglio Acceil or Aceil, Azeil
Acqui Terme Aix, Aiguy
Adriatico la mer Adriatique
Agliano Terme Aillan
Aglie Allié
Agrigento Agrigente
Ailoche Ailoques
Aisone Ayson or Ison
Alagna Valsesia Alagne
Alba Albe
Albareto della Torre Albaret
Albiano d'Ivrea Albian-d'Ivrée
Alessandria Alexandrie
Alfiano Natta Alfian
Alice Castello Alès-Château
Alice Superiore Alès-Superieur
Alpi les Alpes
Albano Vercellese Alban or Auban
Albugnano Albugnan
Alpignano Alpignan
Altavilla Monferrato Hauteville-de-Montferrat
Alto Adige - le Haut-Adige
Alzano Scrivia Alzan
Andezeno Andezen
Andorno Micca Andorn
Angrogna Angrogne
Antignano Antignan
Aramengo Aramengue or Aramingue
Arborio Arbeur
Arena Arêne
Argentera L'Argentiere
Arguello Arguel
Arignano Arignan
Ancona Ancône
Aosta Aoste
Asigliano Vercellese Asillan
Assisi Assise
Asti Aste
Avigliana La Veillane or Veillane, Aveillane
Avolasca Avolasque
Azeglio Azeil or Zey

B
Bagnara Bagneres
Bagnasco Bagnasc
Bagni Aix-les-Bains
Bagnolo Piemonte Bagnol or Bagneux
Bairo Bair
Balangero Balanger
Baldichieri d'Asti Baldiquiers-d'Aste or Budicher, Baudiser
Baldissero Canavese Baldissé-en-Canavais
Baldissero d'Alba Baldissé-d'Albe
Baldissero Torinese Baldissé-de-Turin
Balme Barmes
Balocco Baloc
Balzola Balsole
Banchette Banquettes
Barbania Barbanie
Barbaresco Barbaresque
Bardonecchia Bardonèche, Bardonneche
Barge Barges
Barolo Barol
Barone Canavese Baron-en-Canavais
Basaluzzo Basalus
Basilicata (region) Basilicate
Bassignana Bassignane
Bastia Mondovi la Bastie-de-Montdevi
Battifollo Battifol
Bavantore Bavantour
Beinasco Beinasc
Beinette Beinette
Belforte Monferrato Beaufort-de-Montferrat
Bellino Belin or Blins, Bellins
Bellinzona (Switzerland) Bellinzone
Belluno Bellune
Belvedere Langhe Beauvoir or Belvéder
Bene Vagienna Bénes or Benne Vagienne
Benevello Benevel
Benevento Bénévent
Benna Benne
Bergamasco Bergamasque
Bergamo Bergame
Bergolo Bergol
Bernezzo Bernès
Berzano di San Pietro Bersan
Berzano di Tortona Berzan
Bianze Bianzé or Bianzey
Bibiana Bibiane
Biella Bielle
Bioglio Biolle
Bistagno Bestagne
Bobbio Pellice Bobbi or Boby-de-Pellis
Bollengo Bollingue
Bologna Bologne
Bonvicino Bonvoisin
Borghetto di Borbera Le Bourguet
Borgiallo Borgial or Bourgial
Borgo d'Ale Bourg-d'Alès
Borgofranco d'Ivrea Bourgfranc-d'Ivrée
Borgo San Dalmazzo Bourg-Saint-Dalmas
Borgo San Martino Bourg-Saint-Martin
Borgomale Bourgmal
Borgomasino Bourgmasin
Borgone Susa Bourgon-de-Suze
Borgoratto Alessandrino Bourguerat-de-Alexandrie
Borgosesia Bourg-de-la-Sézia
Borgo Vercelli Bourg-Verceil
Borriana Boriane
Bosco Marengo Bois-Marengo
Bosconero Boisnoir
Bosio Bosie
Bossolasco Bossolasc
Boves Boves
Bozzole Bossole
Bra Bra
Brandizzo Brandis
Brescia Bresce
Briaglia Briaille
Bricherasio Briqueras
Brignano-Frascata Brignan-Frascats
Brindisi Brindes
Brondello Brondel
Brossasco Brossasc
Brosso Breus
Brozolo Brossol
Bruino Bruin
Bruno Brun
Brusaschetto Brusasquet
Brusasco Brusasc or Brousasc
Bruzolo Brusol-de-Suze
Buriasco Inferiore Buriasc-Inférieur
Buriasco Superiore Buriasc-Superieur
Burolo Burol
Buronzo Burons
Busca Busque or Bousque
Bussoleno Bussolin or Boussolens, Boussolin
Brusnengo Brusnengue
Bussoleno Bussolin
Buttigliera d'Asti Butiglière

C
Cafasse Cafasse
Calabria (region) - Calabre
Calamandrana Calamandrane
Callabiana Calebiane
Calliano Callian
Calosso Calos
Caluso Caluse
Calvignano Calvignan
Camagna Monferrato - Camagne-de-Montferrat
Camandona Camandone
Cambiano Cambian
Camburzano Camburzan
Camerana Camerane
Camerano Casasco Cameran-Casasc
Camino Camin
Camo Came
Campania (region) - Campanie
Campertogno Champertogne
Campidoglio (one of the seven hills of Rome) - Capitole
Campiglio Cervo Campille
Campiglione-Fenile Campillon, Champillon 
Canale Canal
Canavese - Canavais
Candelo Candel
Candia Canavese Candie-en-Canavais
Candiolo Candieul
Canelli Canelles
Canischio Canisque
Canosio Canoise
Cantalupo Ligure - Chanteloup
Cantarana Cantarane
Cantoira - Cantoire, Chantoire
Cantalupa Chanteloube, Chantelouve, Cantalupe
Cantalupo Ligure Chanteloup
Capitanata (province) - la Capitanate
Caprauna Capraune
Caprie Chiavrie
Capriglio Caprille
Caprile Capril
Capua - Capoue
Caraglio Carail
Caramagna Piemonte Caramagne
Caravino Caravin
Carbonara Scrivia - Charbonière
Carcoforo Carcofor
Carde Cardé
Carema Carême
Carentino - Carentin
Caresana Caresane
Caresanablot Caresaneblot
Carezzano Caressan
Carignano - Carignan
Carisio Caris
Carmagnola - Carmagnole, Carmagnolles
Carpeneto - Carpenet
Carrara - Carrare
Carrù - Carru
Cartignano Cartignan
Cartosio - Chartreuse, Chartos
Casalbagliano Casal-Bayan, Casal-Bayau
Casalborgone Casalburgon, Casalbourgon
Casal Cermelli Casal-Cermel
Casale Monferrato Casal-Montferrat, Cazal
Casaleggio Boiro Casalège
Casalgrasso Casalgras
Casalnoceto Casalnoisette
Casanova Elvo Maisonneuve
Casapinta Maisonpeinte
Casasco Casasc, Casasque
Cascinette d'Ivrea Casinette-d'Ivrée
Caselette Casellette
Caselle Torinese Caselles, Casel-de-Turin
Caserta Caserte
Casorzo Casours
Cassano Spinola Cassan-Spinole
Cassinasco Cassinasque
Cassinelle Cassinelles
Castagneto Po Châtnignet, Castagnet
Castagnito Castagnit, Castagnet, Châtaignet
Castagnole delle Lanze Castagnole-Lanze, Châtaignoles
Castagnole Monferrato Castagnole-de-Montferrat, Châtaignoles
Castagnole Piemonte Châtaignoles
Castel Boglione Château-Bollione
Casteldelfino Châteaudauphin
Castelferro Castelfer
Castellamonte Castellamont, Chaumont, Castellemon
Castellania Châtellenie
Castellar Châtelard
Castellar Guidobono Châtelard-Guidobone
Castellazzo Bormida Châtelas, Castellas
Castellero Châteler
Castelletto Cervo Châtelet-Cerve
Castelletto d'Erro Châtelet-Val-d'Erre
Castelletto d'Orba Châtelet-Val-d'Orbe
Castelletto Molina Châtelet-Mouline
Castelletto Monferrato le Châtelet
Castelletto Stura Châtelet-de-Sture
Castelletto Uzzone Châtelet-d'Usson
Castellinaldo d'Asti Châtelinaud
Castellino Châtelin
Castellino Tanaro Châtelin, Castelin
Castelmagno Castelmagne, Châtelmagne
Castelnuovo Belbo Châteauneuf-de-Belbe
Castelnuovo Bormida Châteauneuf-de-Bormide
Castelnuovo Calcea Châteauneuf-Calcée
Castelnuovo di Ceva Châteauneuf-de-Ceve
Castelnuovo Don Bosco Château-du-Bois
Castelnuovo Scrivia Châteauneuf-de-Scrivie
Castelnuovo Nigra Châteauneuf-Nigre
Castel Rocchero Château-Roquier
Castelspina Château-Epine
Castiglione Falletto Châtillon-Fallet
Castiglione Tinella Châtillon-Tinelle
Castiglione Torinese Châtillon
Castino Castin, Châtin
Catania Catane
Cavaglia Cavaille
Cavagnolo Cavagneul
Cavallerleone Cavallion, Cavaller-Leone
Cavallermaggiore Cavallimour, Cavallimours, Cavalimour, Cavalimor
Cavatore Cavetour
Cavour -fr. //it.: Cavore, Caorsa // fr. orig.: Caours, Cavour, Cauers, Cavors, Cavours [historical]
Cella Monte Celles
Cellarengo Cellaringue
Celle di Macra Celles
Celle Enomondo Celles
Cellio Celle
Centallo Cental
Cercenasco Cercenasc
Ceres Cérès
Cereseto Cereset
Ceresole d'Alba Cérésoles-d'Albe, Cérisoles
Ceresole Reale Cérésoles
Cerreto Castello Cerret-Château
Cerreto d'Asti Céret-d'Aste, Cerret
Cerreto Grue Céret
Cerreto Langhe Céret-Langue
Cerrina Cerrine
Cerrione Cerrion
Cervasca Cervasque, Cervasc
Cervatto Cervat
Cervere Cervières
Cesena Césène
Cesana Torinese Cézane, Cesane
Cessole Cessoles
Ceva Céve, Seve
Cherasco - Quérasque
Chialamberto Chalambert
Chianocco Chanoux
Chiaverano Chiaveran, Claveran
Chieri Quiers, Chiers, Chier
Chiesanuova Chaiseneuve, L'Eglise-Neuve
Chiomonte Chaumont
Chivasso Chivas, Chevas, Zivas
Chiusa di Pesio Cluse-en-Piemont, Cluse-de-Pes
Chiusa di San Michele - L'Écluse
Chiusano d'Asti Clusan-d'Aste
Cigliano Cillian, Cilian
Ciglie Cilié, Asseille
Ciconio Cigogne
Cinaglio Cinail
Cintano Cintan
Cinzano Cinzan
Cissone Cisson
Cisterna d'Asti Cîterne
Civiasco Civiasc
Clavesana Clavesane
Claviere Clavières
Coassolo Torinese Coasseul-de-Turin
Coazze Coasse, Couasse, Couvasse, Cousse
Coazzolo Coasseul, Quasseul
Cocconato Cocconat, Coconas
Coggiola Cogiole
Collegno Colegne, Collegne
Colleretto Castelnuovo Coloret
Colleretto Giacosa Coloret
Collobiano Collobian
Como Côme
Condove Condoue
Coniolo Conioul
Conzano Consan
Corio Cory, Cœry, Cori
Corneliano d'Alba Corneillan-d'Albe
Corsione Corsion, Coursion
Cortandone Cortandon or Courtendon
Cortanze Courterance, Cortances
Cortazzone Cortanson, Courteson
Cortemilia Courtemille, Cortemille
Cortiglione Courtillon
Cossano Belbo Cossan-Belbe
Cossano Canavese Cossan-en-Canavais
Cossato Cossat
Cossombrato Cossombrat
Costanzana Constansane
Costa Vescovato Côte
Costigliole d'Asti Costilloles-d'Aste
Costigliole Saluzzo Costilloles, Châtillol
Cravanzana Cravansane, Cravensanne
Cremolino Cremolin
Cremona Crémone
Crema Crème
Crescentino Crescentin, Cresentin
Creta Crète
Crevacuore Crevacœur
Crissolo Crisol
Crosa Crose
Crova Crove
Cuccaro Monferrato Cuccar-de-Montferrat
Cuceglio Cucceil
Cuma Cumes
Cumiana Cumiane
Cuneo Coni
Cunico Cunic
Cuorgnè Courgné, (Courgnié, Corgné)
Curino Curin

D
Demonte Démont
Denice Denis
Dernice Dernice
Diano d'Alba Dian-d'Albe
Dogliani Dolianes
Donato Donat
Dora : le département de la Doire
Dorzano Dorzan, Dorsan
Dolomiti : les Dolomites
Dronero Dronier, Droners, Dragoners
Druento Druent
Dusino San Michele Dusin-Saint-Michel

E
Elba - l'Île d'Elbe
Elva Elve
Emilia-Romagna (region) - Émilie-Romagne
Entracque Entraques, Entraigues, Entraigue, Entragues
Envie Envie
Exilles -ital.- Esille, Essille

F
Faenza Faïence
Famagosta - Famagouste
Faeto - Fayet
Felizzano Fellissan, Felissan
Ferrara Ferrare
Firenze Florence
Fornovo di Taro - Fornoue
Francavilla Bisio Francheville
Frascaro Frasquier
Frassinello Monferrato Frassinel-de-Montferrat
Frassineto Po Frassinet-de-Pô
Frassinetto - Frassinet
Fresonara Fressonare
Friuli Frioul
Friuli-Venezia Giulia (region) - le Frioul-Vénétie Julienne
Frugarolo Frugarol
Fubine Fubines
Fucecchio Fucecchie

G
Gabiano Gabian
Gaeta - Gaète
Gamalero Gamaler
Garbagna Garbagne
lago di Garda - lac de Garde
Gavazzana Gavasane
Genova Gênes
Germagnano - Saint-Germain
Gianicolo - Janicule
Giaglione - Jaillons
Giarole Giarole, Gierole, Girolle
Giaveno - Javein
Gorizia - Gorice
Gran Paradiso - le Grand Paradis
Gravere - Gravière
Gremiasco Gremiasque
Grognardo Grognard
Grondona Grondone
Groscavallo - Groscaval
Guarene - Guarène
Guazzora Guassore

I
Imperia Empérie
Inverso Pinasca Envers Pinache
Isola Sant'Antonio Isle-Saint-Antoine, Île-Saint-Antoine
Isole Borromee - îles Borromées
Isole Egadi - îles Égades
Isole Eolie - îles Éoliennes
Ivrea Ivrée (Yvrée)

L
Lanzo Torinese - Lans-l'Hermitage
Lazio (region) - Latium
Lavoro (Terra di) - Labour (Terre de)
Lerma Lerme
Livorno Livourne
Liguria (region) - Ligurie
Lombardia (region) - Lombardie
Loreto - Lorette
Lu Lu
Lucca Lucques

M
Malta - Malte
Malvicino Malvoisin
Mantova - Mantoue
Marche Marches
Masio Mas
Melazzo Mélazze, Mélasse
Merana Merane
Messina Messine
Milano Milan
Mirabello Monferrato Mirebel-de-Montferrat
Modena Modène
Mogadiscio (Somalia) - Mogadiscio (pronounced as Mogadicho)
Molare Molare
Molino dei Torti Moulin-des-Tortues
Mombello Monferrato Montbeau-de-Montferrat, Montbel
Momperone Montperon
Moncalieri Moncallier
Moncestino Montcestin, Montsestin
Mondovì Mondovi
Mongiardino Ligure Montgardin-en-Ligurie
Monleale Montloyal
Montacuto Montaigu
Montaldeo Montaudé
Montaldo Bormida Montald, Monthaut
Montecastello Montchâteau
Montechiaro d'Acqui Montclair-d'Aix
Montegioco Montjeu
Montemarzino Montmassin, Montmarsin
Morano sul Po Moran-sur-Pô
Morbello Morbel
Mornese Mornès
Morsasco Morsasque, 
Murisengo Muriseng, Murisingue

N
Napoli - Naples
Nebrodi - les monts Nébrodes
Novalesa - Novalaise
Novara - Novare
Novi Ligure - Neuve-en-Ligurie

O
Oneglia Oneille
Ostia - Ostie
Otranto - Otrante

P
Padova Padoue
Palermo Palerme
Parma Parme
Pavia  Pavie
Perugia Pérouse
Piemonte Piémont
Pisa Pise
Piacenza Plaisance
Pinerolo Pignerol
Pistoia Pistoie
Porto Maurizio Port-Maurice
Pozzuoli Pouzzoles
Pragelato Pragela
Provincia di Alessandria Province d'Alexandrie [Alexandrie de la Paille]
Puglia Pouilles

R
Ragusa Raguse
Ravenna Ravenne
Reggio di Calabria Reggio de Calabre
Reggio nell'Emilia Reggio d'Emilie
Ribordone - Ribardon
Robecco sul Naviglio - Rebec
Roma Rome
Rorà Roure
Rubicone - Rubicon

S
Salerno Salerne
Saluzzo - Saluces
Sant'Ambrogio di Torino - Saint-Ambroise
Sant'Antonino di Susa - Saint-Antonin
San Didero - Saint-Didier
San Giorio di Susa - Saint-Joire
San Marino (state) - Saint-Marin
Santhià - Santhia
Sarzana - Sarzane
Savona Savone
Sestriere Sestrières
Sestri Levante Sestri-du-Levant
Sestri Ponente Sestri-du-Ponant
Siena Sienne
Susa Suse
Siracusa Syracuse

T
Taormina - Taormine
Taranto Tarente
Torre Pellice La Tour-Pélis
Tortona Tortone
Trento Trente
Treviso Trévise
Torino Turin

U
Urbino - Urbin
Usseglio - Ussel

V
Valgioie - Valjoie
Vaie - Vaye
Varese Varèse
Venezia Venise
Vercelli - Verceil
Verona  - Vérone
Vesuvio (volcan) - Vésuve
Vicenza Vicence
Vigone Vigon
Villar Focchiardo - Villar-Fouchard
Ventimiglia Vintimille
Viterbo Viterbe

Z
Zante - Zante

See also
French exonyms
List of French exonyms for Dutch toponyms
List of French exonyms for German toponyms

French exonyms for Italian
French
French exonyms